Parliamentary elections were held in Nicaragua in November 1922 to elect half of the seats in the Chamber of Deputies and one-third of the seats in the Senate of the National Congress.

The conservative candidates won in practically every district, including the overwhelmingly liberal city of León.

References

Elections in Nicaragua
Nicaragua
1922 in Nicaragua
Election and referendum articles with incomplete results